"Still Waiting" is a song by Australian pop-rock group Uncanny X-Men. The song was released in August 1985 as the third and final single from the band's debut studio album, 'Cos Life Hurts. It peaked at number 43 on the Kent Music Report, becoming the group's third consecutive top 50 single.

"Still Waiting" became an unofficial anthem for Channel 9's popular Wide World of Sports program throughout the remainder of the 1980s.

Track listing 
7" Vinyl (Mushroom – K-9805)
 "Still Waiting" - 3:49
 "Time Goes So Fast"  (Recorded live at the Sydney Entertainment Centre on 7 July 1985) - 3:28

Charts

References

1985 singles
Uncanny X-Men (band) songs
Mushroom Records singles